Alexandra Bulat is the first English county councillor of Romanian background, elected in UK local elections on 6 May 2021.

Social activism 
She is a Labour party member for Abbey division, Cambridgeshire County Council, winning 41.77% of the vote and a majority of 205, despite a 25.76% increase in the Green party votes compared to the previous election.

Dr Bulat also won the University College London's (UCL) Provost Public Engagement ' Find Your Voice' Award in 2020 for public engagement by an early career researcher. She is a leading member of 3million and co-manager of their network for Young Europeans and she volunteers with charity Settled which helps EU people on application for 'settled status', following the UK Brexit arrangements. She was invited to write for the National Institute of Economic and Social Research in 2019, and by Al Jazeera to comment on the freedom of movement arrangements finally agreed for Gibraltar on 31 December 2020. She had previously spoken about incipient racism in Romanian language posters about shoplifting appearing in British supermarkets.  And she was invited to speak about her formal analysis of the attitudes to migration identified in campaign policy fliers for the EU Referendum. She was one of the 33 Labour councillors who signed an open letter to The Guardian calling for a confirmatory referendum on BREXIT.

As an outspoken advocate of EU citizens rights, and a joint British and Romanian citizen, she has been again subject to online racist and xenophobic abuse, since her election, according to 'The London Economic Review''', and shared her experiences at Labour party events, and with political enquiry into the route to citizenship during the Brexit transition period as mentioned in The Independent. Education 
Her doctorate was based on research on exploring whether local contact affected attitudes towards EU migrants in 'a comparison of British, Romanian and Polish residents' views in two English local authorities in the context of Brexit'. Her studies included ephemera in the British Library where her case study analysis identified a bias in the materials against migrants from certain EU countries. A recent collaboration on EU citizens perceived identity is conducted with Professor Tanja Bueltmann of Strathclyde University.

Bulat also has a Masters degree from Cambridge University and an undergraduate degree at Sussex.

 Early experiences 
Bulat had spent a year in the UK as a young child, when her father worked here for the NHS, but the family had to return to Romania, so when she came as a student she could not speak English well, but went on to achieve a doctorate from UCL.  She was later co author of a study funded by EU Horizon Fund to study the impact of 'growing up abroad' as which compared Italian and more recent Romanian cohorts.

 Recent activities 
Romanians are the second largest EU minority in the UK and by March 2021 some 918,000 were among the applicants to remain here. At the closing date in June 2021, for those not yet confirmed to have settled status in the UK, Bulat and others were concerned about the  impact of a late surge in awareness and the backlog in applications and a loss of rights.   BBC reported that she spelled out basic rights that young Europeans would lose, and said that a 'physical proof of status' is needed to suit some people.  Attitudes to migrant workers who previously may have had to take work that  could be considered 'low skilled'  and the future 'points system' blocking access to the labour markets currently relying on EU migrants was a concern of her research in 2019.  In the debate on voter identification for voting in the UK, Bulat and others produced a report on the current and potential  impact on under-represented groups in London. As vice-chair of the County Council committee looking at paid family leave, a motion which was then passed, she had said  "For me this is a matter of principle and basic rights, especially if we want to improve diversity in local government”.

 Publications 

 See Google Scholar'' listing

References 

Romanian emigrants to the United Kingdom
Alumni of University College London
English politicians